Xenocerus enganensis is a species of beetles from the family Anthribidae, also known as fungus weevils.

Description 
Xenocerus enganensis can reach a body length of about 13 mm. The basic colour is brown, with white markings on the head, the pronotum and the elytra. This species exhibits a strong sexual dimorphism, with very different sizes in males and females. The antennae in the males are thread-like and much longer than the body.

Distribution 
This species can be found in Enggano Island.

References 

 Biolib
 Global species

Anthribidae
Beetles described in 1897